A correlation inequality is any of a number of inequalities satisfied by the correlation functions of a model. Such inequalities are of particular use in statistical mechanics and in percolation theory.

Examples include:
Bell's inequality
FKG inequality
Griffiths inequality, and its generalisation, the Ginibre inequality
Gaussian correlation inequality

References

External links

Probabilistic inequalities
Statistical mechanics
Inequalities